The Indian Point Formation is a geologic formation in Quebec. It preserves fossils dating back to the Ludlow epoch of the Silurian period.

Description 
The Indian Point Formation comprises thin- to thick-bedded, locally fossiliferous, calcareous siltstones, fine-grained sandstones, calcarenites, and minor biostromal limestones, conglomerates, red siltstones, and mafic volcanic rocks. The Indian Point Formation is conformably overlain by within-plate tholeiitic mafic to intermediate flows and flow breccias of the Archibald Settlement Formation, developed as a synsedimentary normal fault in the Late Silurian, based on the presence of polymictic conglomerate beds in a thickened Indian Point section east of the fault. Post-Early Devonian (Acadian) orogenic events have produced open to close folds with northeast-trending axes.

Fossil content 
The following fossils were reported from the formation:

Eurypterids 
 Waeringopterus sp.

Pterobranchia 
 Monograptus nilssoni

See also 
 List of fossiliferous stratigraphic units in Quebec
 Bertie Formation, Silurian Lagerstätte in Ontario
 Charlevoix impact structure, Silurian impact structure in Quebec

References

Bibliography 
 

Geologic formations of Canada
Silurian System of North America
Silurian Quebec
Ludlow epoch
Sandstone formations
Siltstone formations
Conglomerate formations
Silurian volcanism
Silurian southern paleotemperate deposits
Paleontology in Quebec